The Second Cabinet of Helle Thorning-Schmidt was the Government of Denmark in office from 3 February 2014 to 28 June 2015. It was a coalition government between the Social Democrats and the Social Liberal Party.

It was preceded by the First Cabinet of Helle Thorning-Schmidt, a cabinet that ended when the Socialist People's Party left the government.

Government formations 
Helle Thorning-Schmidt formed the First Cabinet of Helle Thorning-Schmidt following the 2011 parliamentary election and lead a coalition government consisting of her own Social Democrats, the Social Liberal Party and the Socialist People's Party until 2014.

On 30 January 2014, the Socialist People's Party announced their departure from the government due to a conflict over the proposed sale of DONG Energy shares to Goldman Sachs. Before departure, they also announced they will support Helle Thorning-Schmidt although not being a part of her government.

This event lead to the resignation of the First Cabinet of Helle Thorning-Schmidt and the formation of the Second Cabinet of Helle Thorning-Schmidt on 3 February 2014.

The Second Cabinet of Thorning-Schmidt resigned following defeat in the 2015 general election.

List of ministers 
The Social Democrats had thirteen ministers including the Prime Minister. The Social Liberal Party had seven ministers.

|}

References 

Cabinets of Denmark
2014 establishments in Denmark
Cabinets established in 2014
2015 disestablishments in Denmark
Cabinets disestablished in 2015